Jan Pietersz Graeff (Amsterdam, 1512 - there, 1553) was an Amsterdam regent and cloth merchant from the 16th century.

Biography

Family 

Jan Pietersz Graeff was the son of Pieter Graeff, the first known representative of the Dutch De Graeff family. Pieter was probably a son of Wolfgang von Graben from the Von Graben family. It is uncertain which one was the first Graeff active in Amsterdam [Pieter or Jan]. Jans mother was Griet Pietersdr Berents  
descendant from Wouter Berensz and his wife Dieuwer Willemsz de Grebber, called Berents, of the De Grebber family, baljuws of the Waterland, and Willem Eggert, stadtholder of Holland.

Jan Pietersz Graeff married to Stein Braseman and had five sons who survived their childhood:
 Pieter Jansz Graeff (died before 1547), married Maria Jacobsdr Dobbens
 Lenaert Jansz de Graeff (about 1530–35 - before 1578), according to a family tradition he was ident with "Monseigneur de Graeff", from Bruges, a water geus in the Eighty Years' War. He is treated as one of the leaders of the Sea beggars. His character was also used in a historical novel about his friend Hendrick van Brederode, De Grote Geus.
 Dirk Jansz Graeff (1532-1589), mayor of Amsterdam
 Cornelis Pieter Jansz Graeff, he remained unmarried
 Jacob Jansz Graeff (died after 1580), he married Geertge Claes Coppensdr van Ouder Amstel, the couple had three children; Jacob Jansz had an extramarital son too:
 Styntje (Stijntje) Jacobsdr Graeff, married to Hendrik Stuijver, Lord of Ravensberg (died 1590), and afterwards to Herman Roswinkel
 Jan Jacobsz Graeff (born around 1570/75), founder of a family branch in Alblasserdam; father of Claes Jansz Graeff, grandfather of Albert Claesz de Graeff (born around 1620), rear admiral at the Admiralty of Amsterdam
 Claes Jacobsz Graeff
 Adriaan Jacobsz Graeff, illegitimate son who had descendants, who are said to have moved to Prussia, Saxony and Austria

Life 
Jan P Graeff lived in a house on Damrak, called Huis De Keyser, which was owned by his descendants for centuries. His sons Lenaert, Dirk and Jacob ran a hardware store in the house called De Keyzershoed (Huis de Keyser) in the Niezel street, where the Imperial Crown later hung. There he ran a cloth trade, and in 1539 he was chief of the Guild of the Amsterdam cloth merchants. Graeff also traded in Antwerp, the former warehouse of English cloth. When he wanted to establish himself as a trader in North Brabant, his sons intervened to return him to Amsterdam soon. In 1542 he became a councilor and in 1543 he was appointed alderman (Schepen) of Amsterdam. Due to its political activities, the De Graeff family is one of the few patrician families to sit in government before and after the Amsterdam Alteratie of 1578.

Joost van den Vondel called Graeff in his verse Aen den hooghedelen heer Pieter de Graef, vryheer van Zuitpolsbroek, op den oorsprongk van het geslagt der graven "den braven" (the good one). Vondel also commemorated him in his Mengeldicht.

Progenitor Pieter Graeff 

Jans father Pieter Graeff was probably born around 1484. His alleged father Wolfgang von Graben (1465-1521) was recorded in Holland in 1483, and that he had Pieter as a son. It cannot be determined whether Pieter was born in Amsterdam. Biographical cornerstones of his life cannot be determined, but it is reported that he married Griet Pieters(dr) Berents in 1512, a woman whose family came from the patriciate of Amsterdam and the low nobility of the area. She may was a daughter of Berend Berends, in 1509 advisor of Amsterdam, himself a son or second line descendant (grandson, nephew) of Jan Berents, Lord of Randenbroek (Amersfoort), the son of Wouter Berensz and his wife Dieuwer Willemsdr de Grebber (born around 1385 or later), called Berents, of the De Grebber family, baljuws of the Waterland. The Berents family inherited the fief Randenbroek from the De Grebber.

Griet Pietersdr Berents came from the female line of this family, and through the marriage of her ancestor Willem Grebber Jonge Willem Grebberszoon (born around 1362–1434; father of Dieuwer Willemsdr de Grebber) to Lijsbeth Willemsdr Eggert (born around 1390 or later; also named Imme Eggert), she was also a descendant of Lijsbeths father Willem Eggert (1360-1417), stadholder of Holland.

Pieter and Griet had one son, Jan Pietersz Graeff, who continued the family line in Amsterdam. His coat of arms from 1542 or 1543 shows the shovel of the Von Graben and the swan of the De Grebber family.

About the family crest of Pieter's wife Griet: Jan Berents, Lord of Randenbroek, the ancestor of Griet Pietersdr Berents, had a coat of arms which hangs in a chapel in the Nieuwe Kerk of Amsterdam. It shows a quartered shield with the arms of the Berents, De Grebber, Eggert and Boel (Boelens Loen). During the 15th and 16th centuries, these families were at the head of the Amsterdam patriciate and, with the exception of the Boelens, belonged to the knightly nobility.

References 

1512 births
1553 deaths
Jan Pietersz, Graeff
Nobility from Amsterdam